is a Japanese television jidaigeki show featuring Sonny Chiba that ran for four seasons in the early 1980s. The first season was a reimagining of the film Kage no Gundan: Hattori Hanzō directed by Eiichi Kudo which was released in 1980.

Chiba played different ninja characters in each series. In the first series he played Hattori Hanzō III, in the second he played Tsuge Shinpachi, in the third he played Tarao Hanzō, and in the fourth series and in Bakumatsu Hen he played Hattori Hanzō XV. In the 2003 direct-to-DVD series Shin Kage no Gundan (New Shadow Warriors) he played Hattori Hanzō I.

Seasons 
Hattori Hanzō: Kage no Gundan (1980) - 27 episodes
Kage no Gundan II (1981 - 1982) - 26 episodes
Kage no Gundan III (1982) - 26 episodes
Kage no Gundan IV (1985) - 27 episodes
Kage no Gundan Bakumatsu Hen (1985) - 13 episodes
Shin Kage no Gundan (2003 - 2005) - 6 direct to video episodes (not part of the TV series)

DVD release 
The complete first season of the show was released on April 17, 2007 on Region 1 DVD by BCI Home Entertainment.

In other media
Chiba reprised the Hattori Hanzō character for Kill Bill.
Quentin Tarantino stated in the supplementary material on the Kill Bill DVD that the character was named in tribute to Chiba's former role as Hattori Hanzō (the historical 16th-century Iga ninja) in Shadow Warriors (Kage no Gundan).  The joke is that Chiba played multiple generations of the character: when the character died, the next installment would shift to covering his descendant, also named Hanzō after his famous predecessor. The implication is that the character in Kill Bill, whom Tarantino called Hattori Hanzō XIV, is another descendant of the same lineage.  Chiba's daughter Juri Manase also appears in Kill Bill as a member of the Crazy 88. A digitized version of a promo image for the series' second season infamously appears on the title screen of The Revenge of Shinobi.

Cast

Hattori Hanzō: Kage no Gundan (Season 1)

Sonny Chiba as Hattori Hanzō
Kenji Takaoka as Hyōroku
Naomi Hase as Okiri
Shōhei Hino as Daihachi
Junichi Haruta as Kiheiji
Kyoko Mitsubayashi as Okō
Kantarō Suga as Minakuchi Kisanta
Renji Ishibashi as Minakuchi Kisirō
Hiroshi Inuzuka as ikoma
Nobuo Kaneko as Sakai Tadakiyo
Teruhiko Saigō as Tsutusmi Kyonosuke
So Yamamura as Hoshina Masayuki
Kirin Kiki as Orin
Yōko Kurita as O-ume

Kage no Gundan II (Season 2)
Sonny Chiba as Tsuge Shinpachi
Jun Eto as Tsuruzō
Masato Hoshi as Utanosuke
Hikaru Kurosaki (:ja:黒崎輝) as Koroku
Mayumi Asaka as Otoki
Isamu Nagato as Gohei
Etsuko Shihomi as Shiina Misato
Mikio Narita as Ōoka Tadamitsu
So Yamamura as Hiraga Gennai
Hiroyuki Sanada as Hayate Kozō
Kirin Kiki as Orin

Kage no Gundan III (Season 3)
Sonny Chiba as Tarao Hanzō
Etsuko Shihomi as Ochō
Hiroyuki Sanada as Sasuke
Keizō Kanie as Takebayashi Toramaro
Hikaru Kurosaki as Shunta
Kawarasaki Kenzō as Ryuken
Kyoko Kishida as Takatsukasa Takako
Yoko Akino as Kobue
Eitaro Ozawa as Tokugawa Mitsusada

Kage no Gundan IV (Season 4)
Sonny Chiba as Hattori Hanzō
Isao Hashizume as Hyōsai
Kimiko Ikegami as Satsuki
Jun Miho as Ayame
Junichi Ishida as Kikuji
Kenji Ohba as Gamahachi
Tsuyoshi Ihara as Zenkyu
MIE as Ochō
Etsuko Shihomi as Oren
Hikaru Kurosaki as Junta
Mari Chihara as Toki
Hiroyuki Sanada as Katsu Kaishū
Mikio Narita as Ii Naosuke
Gaku Yamamoto as Hotta Masayoshi
Kantaro Suga as  Murayama Taizō
Masanori Sera as Sakamoto Ryoma
Bunjaku Han as Osai
Kirin Kiki as Botan

Kage no Gundan Bakumatsu Hen (Season 5)

Sonny Chiba as Hattori Hanzō
Isao Hashizume as Hyōsai
Kenji Ohba as Gamahachi
Tsuyoshi Ihara as Zenkyu
MIE as Ochō
Isao Natsuyagi as Oguri Kozukenosuke
Hiroyuki Sanada as Katsu Kaishū
Masanori Sera as Sakamoto Ryoma
Seiichirō Kameishi as Tateoka Dōsetsu
Kirin Kiki as Botan

References

External links 
  

1980 films
1980s Japanese television series
Direct-to-video film series
1980s Japanese-language films
Japanese drama television series
Jidaigeki films
Ninja fiction
Jidaigeki television series
Cultural depictions of Hattori Hanzō
1980s Japanese films